The 2021–22 season was the 119th season in the existence of Beşiktaş J.K. and the club's 62nd consecutive season in the top flight of Turkish football. In addition to the domestic league, Beşiktaş participated in this season's editions of the Turkish Cup and the Turkish Super Cup.

Season events
9 December, Head Coach Sergen Yalçın left his position by mutual consent.

Squad

Out on loan

Transfers

In

Loans in

Out

Loans out

Released

Pre-season and friendlies

Competitions

Overview

Süper Lig

League table

Results summary

Results by round

Matches

Turkish Cup

Turkish Super Cup

UEFA Champions League

Group stage

The draw for the group stage was held on 26 August 2021.

Squad statistics

Appearances and goals

|-
|colspan="14"|Players out on loan:
|-
|colspan="14"|Players who left Beşiktaş during the season:
|}

Goal scorers

Clean sheets

Disciplinary Record

References

Beşiktaş J.K. seasons
Beşiktaş
2021–22 UEFA Champions League participants seasons